Do Wah Nanny is the third studio album by Bahamian folk musician Exuma. It was released in 1971, and was the first record by Exuma to be issued through Kama Sutra Records.

Reception

In a retrospective review, Stewart Mason of AllMusic wrote that Do Wah Nanny "moves away a bit from the voodoo imagery" of Ezuma's previous two albums, "instead going for a good-timey sound similar to the New Orleans gumbo of Dr. John." Mason concluded, "Exuma and his mostly percussive band wend their way through the eight mostly lengthy ('22nd Century' runs nine droning minutes) tracks with the mixture of smoldering passion and infectious joy that's at the heart of Bahamian music."

Track listing

Original vinyl release

1992 CD reissue

Personnel
Adapted from the album's liner notes.

 Exuma – lead vocals, background vocals, guitar, ankle bells, "sacred foot drums"
 Bob Wyld (credited as Daddy Ya-Ya) – marching drum, background vocals
 Peppy Thielhelm – congas, percussion
 Lord Wellington – congas, percussion
 Lord Cherry – congas, percussion
 Yogi – junk bells, background vocals
 Sally O'Brien – background vocals, whistles
 Diana Claudia Bunea – background vocals, whistles
 H. W. Mannings – cowbells
 Cordell Thompson – cowbells
 Alfred "Peewee" Ellis – saxophone (on "Do Wah Nanny")
 John Gatchell – trumpet (on "Do Wah Nanny")
 Bruce Samuels – bass (on "Do Wah Nanny")

Production
 Daddy Ya-Ya – producer
 Bob Liftin – engineer

References

1971 albums
Exuma (musician) albums
Kama Sutra Records albums